Karle Warren is an American actress, known for her portrayal as Lauren Cassidy, the daughter of Judge Amy Gray, in the CBS hit drama, Judging Amy.

Filmography

References

External links

Living people
20th-century American actresses
21st-century American actresses
Actresses from California
American child actresses
American film actresses
American television actresses
People from Salinas, California
Year of birth missing (living people)